Patricia Hackett (25 January 1908 – 18 August 1963) was an Australian heiress, lawyer, actress and author, remembered today in the Patricia Hackett Award for writing.

History
Patricia Hackett was born in Perth, Western Australia to John Winthrop Hackett M.L.C. and his wife Dr. Deborah Vernon Hackett, née Drake-Brockman, later known as Sir Winthrop and Lady Hackett. Sir Winthrop, who endowed the entire University of Western Australia, died on 19 February 1916 and Lady Hackett married again, on 10 April 1918 to Frank Beaumont Moulden (1876–1932) and moved to Adelaide with her children, living at "Lordello", Palmer Place, North Adelaide. He became Mayor of Adelaide in 1919 and was knighted in 1922.

Patricia began law studies at the University of Adelaide in 1925 without having passed in Latin, which was then a pre-requisite, and applied to enter her articles while deferring this examination. Another student, Claude Joseph Philcox, made a similar request, both no doubt intending to study the subject concurrently. This had for some time been permitted by the great English universities, but the application was denied.

In 1926 Patricia Hackett and her sister, Miss Joan Hackett (23 February 1909 – 19 December 1966), were expelled from the University of Adelaide for impersonation at the Leaving examination in Latin. In other words, Joan Hackett sat the Latin exam for her sister Patricia Hackett.

Barred from further study in Australia, Patricia left for to London, where was admitted as a student to the Inner Temple in May 1928, completed her studies and returned with fellow-graduate Margery Lawrence to Adelaide in late 1929, and was called to the English Bar on 27 January 1930, one of four women (two of them Australian) to be so honoured.

In 1933, as junior to Llandaff Brisbane Mathews (1896–1954), she defended Salem Macksad, a Syrian storekeeper of Gilbert Street, who was accused of murdering his neighbour Richard Joseph Supple, with whose wife he had an illicit relationship. The victim was found on Memorial Drive near the golf course with a fractured skull the evident cause of death. Macksad was convicted of the lesser crime of manslaughter. This has been cited as the first time in Australia a woman lawyer has defended a male accused of a capital crime, but appears to be the only high-profile case with which she was professionally involved.

In 1936 she was invited to do some legal work at Tulagi, Solomon Islands, and returned there for three or four months each year thereafter, staying on the island of M'Bangai on which she took out a 99-year lease (one authority asserts purchased). She took out a practising lawyer's certificate in Fiji, their first woman lawyer. Her last sojourn on the island was cut short by the Pearl Harbor attack of 1941, when she and many other Australians including Mrs. Ragnar Hyne and Mrs. W. H. Baddeley, wife of the Bishop of Melanesia, were evacuated.

The young lawyer Don Dunstan shared chambers with Patricia for a few years from 1952.

Theatre and Arts
Soon after her return to Adelaide, Hackett threw herself into amateur theatre. In April 1930 she appeared in the comedy The Truth About Blayds by A. A. Milne, with the Repertory Theatre Group, their first production at the Australia Theatre in Angas Street. She appeared in half-a-dozen further Repertory productions in the next three years.

In April 1934 she founded, and personally funded, in Gawler Place, "The Torch", Adelaide's first intimate theatre. The venue, seating 150 persons, was previously a sales showroom with an entrance on Claridge Arcade and stage access from Rundle Street via a narrow right-of-way. Membership was one guinea per annum, and entitled the holder to one seat per production and preferential purchase of additional seats for any performance.
She created a minor furore in September 1934 after receiving an adverse critique in The Advertiser over her performance in Geza Silberer's play Caprice. (The News had, as usual, given her glowing, not to say sycophantic, reviews). Her response was to fling the contents of a bottle of ink over the hapless journalist Sidney Downer.
Patricia then peremptorily barred all journalists from The Advertiser from her theatre. Later that year she took a long sea voyage "for her health", promising that "The Torch" would continue in her absence, but in fact it never reopened.

In 1938 she published These Little Things, illustrated by Rex Wood, a collection of poems about her life in Adelaide and in the Solomon Islands.

Patricia's acting was highly stylized, with an exaggerated gracefulness in the grand style, dominating every scene. She had a priceless collection of authentic Eastern costumes and "hard properties", with which she lavishly decorated her productions, adding to their other-worldly atmosphere. In 1944, following her appearance in Gild the Mask Again, Max Harris wrote in On Dit (the University of Adelaide student newspaper) a strident critique of Patricia's histrionic style:
We have now seen Miss Hackett as a Biblical dame, Virgin Mary, a Moon Woman, Salome, a Grey Sword, Queen Elizabeth, and a Renaissance wife. It only remains for her to play a Life of Stalin, Diaghilev and Little Nell. ... let the Theatre Guild forget the panther passions of the Hackett demi-monde ... (and place) ... more stress on Theatre and less on Art
Hackett sued for libel. On the advice of John Reed, Harris made an abject apology, so avoiding a costly lawsuit. Worse was to attend him: this happened on the eve of his publication of the Ern Malley poems and the ensuing obscenity trials.

Theatre productions
Australia Theatre, Angas Street
April 1930 The Truth About Blayds (A. A. Milne) as Septima.
September 1930 The Man with a Load of Mischief (Ashley Dukes) as the prince's runaway mistress
October 1931 Death Takes a Holiday as Grazia, Death's lover (Alberto Casella)
October 1932 Berkeley Square (John L. Balderston and J. C. Squire) as the earlier Standish's soulmate
November 1933 Cradle Song (Martinez Sierra) as Sister Johanna of the Cross
December 1933 excerpts from Medea (Euripides) and Agamemnon (Aeschylus)

The Torch theatre, Gawler Place
April 1934 Salome (Oscar Wilde) directed by Frank Johnston; Hackett as Salome, Cyril Riley as Herod and was well received.
June 1934 The Virgin Unmasked (Henry Fielding) and Homage to the Unknown (George Preedy).
September 1934: Caprice (Sil-Vara) This was the production which culminated in the notorious ink-slinging incident.
August 1935: The Beaux' Stratagem (George Farquhar)
October 1935: Shadowy Waters (W. B. Yeats) and excerpts from The Dream of Gerontius (Cardinal Newman).

At Adelaide University's "The Hut" theatre, Patricia directed:
1942 Variations in Verse
1943 The Medea (Euripides)
1943 Stories in Dance and Verse, co-directed with Joanne Priest
1944 Renaissance Night and Gild the Mask Again (T. B. Morris)
1945 The Motherly and Auspicious (Maurice Collis)
1945 And So To Bed (J. B. Fagan)
1946 The Beautiful One (T. B. Morris)
1947 L'Enfant Prodigue (Claude Debussy), co-directed with Jean Cook
1947 The Countess Cathleen (W. B. Yeats)
1948 The Old Ladies (Rodney Ackland)
1948 The Medea (Euripides)
1949 Legend (Patricia Hackett)
1949 Aglavaine and Sélysette (Maurice Maeterlinck)
She gathered around her a dedicated and faithful group of disciples, including Hedley Cullen (1915–1994), a well-known baritone, Nancy Cullen (best known as a mezzo-soprano), Don Dunstan, Francis Flannagan (1912–), Mary Patricia "Patsy" Flannagan (1914–), Francis Gargaro, best known as Frank Gargro (1920– ), Ron Haddrick, Max Height, Audine Leith (née Cheek), Peter Leith, Kevin Manser (1925–2001), Stella Sobels (1900– ), John Taylor, Iris Thomas and Lionel Williams.

Patricia later held theatrical performances in the basement of her home at 69 Hackney Road, Hackney, which she shared with Dr. A. M. Mocatta (1887–1984). In later years she suffered from arthritis, relieved by heroin, to which she became addicted. After an hiatus of several years, one last final performance was held in 1960 at the Mocatta House theatre, in conjunction with the inaugural Adelaide Festival of Arts: Legend, a performance which included much of Patricia Hackett's own verse.

Dr. Mocatta inherited the house, which she left, along with her art collection, to the National Trust. Dubbed "Mocatta House", and whose history includes development by wine and distillation pioneer Wilhelm Nitschke, it was controversially sold in 1994, as later were the artworks.

Other activities
In February 1932 she represented her father posthumously at a ceremony in Perth to present his bequest which founded the University of Western Australia. Lady Moulden was conferred with honorary degree of LLD., the first woman to be so honored in Australia.

In late 1934 Patricia took a sea voyage.

She had a serious operation early in 1936, and in late March took a sea voyage to London with her little charge Elizabeth Kennedy (c. 1934– ), a niece of violinist Daisy Kennedy, later Mrs. John Drinkwater. Another report had her taking a voyage on a cargo boat with Dr. Mocatta. Whichever report was true, Patricia was in London in May.

She had a (summer?) cottage "Nepenthe" at Nortons Summit in the 1930s and 1940s, and spent many holidays prior to the Pacific War in 1941 in the Solomon Islands, living in Tulagi harbor on the island of M'bangai, on which she had a long-term lease. One report asserts that she had a legal practice in the Solomon Islands, where she was the first woman solicitor.

At the outbreak of World War II, she formed a Voluntary Service Detachment with several other professional women including Dr. Mocatta.

Bibliography
 Five illustrations by Rex Wood.

Recognition
The Patricia Hackett Prize, endowed in her memory, has been awarded by the University of Western Australia to the best original contribution to Westerly each year since 1965.

See also 
List of first women lawyers and judges in Oceania

References 

1908 births
1963 deaths
20th-century Australian lawyers
Australian women lawyers
Australian stage actresses
Australian women poets
Australian theatre directors
20th-century Australian women
20th-century women lawyers